Sala Budha is a 2012 Indian Kosli language feature film directed by Sabyasachi Mohapatra. The film had won awards in seven categories at Odisha State Film Awards including best film and best director.

Plot
The story is based on a small village during British rule. In the mid-1930s, under British rule, the small villages of India were still ruled by the kings and the kings paid tax to the British government.

The story revolved around a poor and small village of Odisha, India. Bhagatram Gauntia, the sarapancha (village leader) of the village, fondly called Sala Budha (The Stupid Old Man) by the villagers, is an honest and kind person and takes good care of his subjects. Due to drought, people of the village were unable to pay the tax for five years and being the village head Bhagatram Gauntia couldn't force anyone to pay it due to his kindness. And so is the village head too couldn't pay the tax to the king and was living in a threat to lose his land and leadership. He believes in God and he tries his best to help them to survive from the drought and stay together. He says god is never wrong and everything's going to be fine. Meanwhile some villagers who didn't want him to remain as village head meet the king and provoke against him. As a result, the king decides to visit the village and snatch Bhagatram Gauntia's land and leadership (as the village head). The king visits the place, learns the truth and praises him.

Cast
Atal Bihari Panda
Prithviraj Nayak
Ratan Meher and crew

Release

Festival screening
The movie was selected for the International Film Festival of India's Indian Panorama Section in 2013.

This film was selected for the 44th International Film Festival of India in 2013. This was also officially selected for the Indian Panorama section. It has also won the best feature film award at the Jakarta International Film Festival.

Reception

Critical reception
The movie has rewarded with several award by government and acclaimed internationally.

Awards and nominations

Notes

References

External links
 
http://incredibleorissa.com/oriyafilms/sala-budha-oriya-sambalpuri-movie-sabyasachi-mohapatra/
http://www.orissapost.com/no-oriya-film-makes-cut-at-goa-film-festival/
http://www.orissapost.com/self-proclaimed-godman-flees-gold-ornaments-weapons-liquor-and-objectionable-material-seized/
http://www.orissadiary.com/ShowEntertainmentNews.asp?id=62620
http://www.orissadiary.com/CurrentNews.asp?id=48468
http://odishasuntimes.com/2013/10/23/sabyasachi-mohapatras-sala-budha-in-indian-panorama/

2010s Odia-language films
2012 films
Films directed by Sabyasachi Mohapatra